Maialen Axpe Etxabe (born 4 May 1993) is a Basque athlete specialising in the pole vault. She won a silver medal at the 2018 Ibero-American Championships.

Her personal bests in the event are 4.45 metres outdoors (Getafe 2018) and 4.50 metres indoors (Antequera 2019).

International competitions

References

1993 births
Living people
Spanish female pole vaulters
Sportspeople from Gipuzkoa
People from Mondragón
Athletes (track and field) at the 2018 Mediterranean Games
Mediterranean Games competitors for Spain
Athletes from the Basque Country (autonomous community)
21st-century Spanish women